In Norway, the number of women's magazines in 2013 were 17, whereas there were only three men's magazines. The circulation of Norwegian magazines declined 32% from 2004 to 2012.

The following is a list of Norwegian magazines, listed by circulation in 2007, according to the Norwegian Media Businesses' Association. The list contains only weekly magazines, and is limited to the top twenty.

Other magazines